The Buriram International Circuit (known as Chang International Circuit (ช้าง อินเตอร์เนชั่นแนล เซอร์กิต) for commercial purposes, but listed by its non-commercial name because of alcohol restrictions in some countries) is a motorsport race track in Buriram, Buriram Province, Thailand. The circuit was opened in 2014. This is the first FIA Grade 1 and FIM Grade A circuit in Thailand. The track's primary corporate sponsor, Chang Beer, named the track as part of the sponsorship; however, because of laws regarding alcohol sponsorship in France and Qatar, the circuit uses the non-commercial name in FIM documentation.

History
The Japanese Super GT has visited Buriram since 2014. Also, the TCR International Series, TCR Asia Series and GT Asia Series is scheduled to race at Buriram in October 2015, and the World Touring Car Championship in November 2015, and the Asian Le Mans Series in January 2016.

On 22 March 2015, the first ever Thailand round of the World Superbike Championship was held at the circuit. Both of the Superbike races were won by UK rider Jonathan Rea and the World Supersport race was won by Thai rider Ratthapark Wilairot, much to the delight of the Thai spectators.

On 23 June 2015, it was announced that the Porsche Carrera Cup Asia series would be visiting the circuit for the seventh and eighth rounds of the one-make series.

On 12 March 2016, the second Thailand round of the World Superbike Championship was held.  UK rider Jonathan Rea again won race 1, UK rider Tom Sykes won race 2.  The World Supersport race was won by the French rider Jules Cluzel.

On 11 March 2017, the third Thailand round of the World SuperBike Championship took place.  UK rider Jonathan Rea scored his hattrick of race 1 wins at the circuit and also won race 2.  The World Supersport race was won by Italian rider Federico Caricasulo, local Thai rider Decha Kraisart came second.

In September 2017, Dorna Sports confirmed that MotoGP will be held at the Buriram International Circuit, with a three-year commitment running from 2018 to 2020 for a race called the PTT Thailand Grand Prix.

Lap records

The lap records at the Chang International Circuit are listed as:

Events

 Current

 March: Asia Road Racing Championship
 May: GT World Challenge Asia, GT4 Asia Series
 August: Porsche Carrera Cup Asia
 October: Grand Prix motorcycle racing Thailand motorcycle Grand Prix, Asia Talent Cup
 December: Asia Road Racing Championship

 Former

 Asian Formula Renault (2016)
 Asian Le Mans Series 4 Hours of Buriram (2016–2020)
 F3 Asian Championship (2019–2020)
 Formula 4 South East Asia Championship (2017–2019)
 Formula Masters China (2016)
 GT Asia Series (2015–2016, 2018)
 Superbike World Championship (2015–2019)
 Super GT (2014–2019)
 TCR Asia Series (2015–2016)
 TCR International Series (2015)
 World Touring Car Championship FIA WTCC Race of Thailand (2015)

Gallery

Notes

References

External links

Chang International Circuit official website

Motorsport venues in Thailand
Buildings and structures in Buriram province
Sports venues completed in 2014
Superbike World Championship circuits
World Touring Car Championship circuits
Racing circuits designed by Hermann Tilke
2014 establishments in Thailand